Marmora and Lake is a municipality along the banks of Crowe River and Beaver Creek, about midway between Toronto and Ottawa on provincial Highway 7 in Hastings County in Central Ontario, Canada. It is home to approximately 4,000 full time and seasonal residents, many of whom enjoy outdoor recreation and relaxation on Crowe Lake.

Communities
Deloro
Malone
Marmora – largest and primary population centre within the municipality
Marmora Station

History
The original township of Marmora was named in 1820 for the Latin word for marble, while the adjoining Township of Lake was named for Viscount Gerard Lake. The two townships were joined to form the single municipality of Marmora and Lake in 2001. The village of Marmora separated from the township and was incorporated as a separate municipality in 1901.

Mining played an important role in the development of the area. Iron mining was particularly important in the area. Other minerals extracted from township mines include copper, lead, silver, gold and lithographic limestone. Today, talc and dolomite are processed in the municipality at the site of the former Bethlehem Steel Corporation iron ore open pit mine.

In 1998, the township expanded through an amalgamation of the Village of Deloro.

The current municipality was formed in 2001 through an amalgamation of the Village of Marmora and the existing Township of Marmora and Lake.

Demographics 

According to the 2006 Census, mother tongue of its population is:
 English as first language: 92.5%
 French as first language: 1.5%
 English and French as first language: 0%
 Other as first language: 6.0%

Government
Marmora and Lake Council :
Jan O'Neill, Mayor
Mike Stevens, Deputy Mayor
Jason Carman, Councillor
Ron Derry, Councillor
Bernie Donaldson, Councillor

Provincial and federal representation:
M.P.P. Ric Bresee, Progressive Conservative Party of Ontario, for the provincial riding of Hastings—Lennox and Addington, elected in the 2022 provincial election.
M.P. Shelby Kramp-Neuman, Conservative Party of Canada, for the federal riding of Hastings—Lennox and Addington, elected in the 2021 Canadian federal election.

Tourist attractions
 Marmoraton Mine
 Nayler's Common Wetland and Trails
 Eastern Ontario Trails
 Callaghan's Rapids
 Crowe Lake
 Beaver Creek
 MACKFest

Notable residents
 Yaphet Kotto - actor
 Sarah and Rob Skinner - Red Dirt Skinners musical group
 Greg Terrion - Toronto Maple Leafs hockey player

See also
List of townships in Ontario

References

Other map sources:

External links

Lower-tier municipalities in Ontario
Municipalities in Hastings County